= Aghal =

Aghal اغال
- Location within Pakistan
- Coordinates: 33.72°N 70.79°E
- Country: Pakistan
- Territory: Federally Administered Tribal Areas
- Elevation: 2,086 m (6,844 ft)
- Time zone: UTC+5 (PST)
  - Summer (DST): UTC+6 (PDT)

Aghal (Urdu: اغال) is a town in the Federally Administered Tribal Areas of Pakistan. It is located at 33°43'9N 70°47'34E with an altitude of 2086 metres (6847 feet).
